Palaiokastro or Paliokastro (Παλιόκαστρο or Παληόκαστρο, meaning "old castle") may refer to the following places in Greece:

 Palaiokastritsa, a municipality in Corfu
 Palaiokastro, an old name for the town of Myrina, Lemnos island 
 Palaiokastro, Andros, a village in the municipal unit Korthio, Andros island
 Palaiokastro, Arcadia, a village in Arcadia
 Palaiokastro, Chalkidiki, a village in the municipal unit Polygyros, Chalkidiki
 Palaiokastro, Heraklion, a village in Heraklion regional unit, Crete
 Palaiokastro, Ios, a medieval castle in the island of Ios
 Palaiokastro, Kozani, a village in the municipal unit Siatista, Kozani regional unit
 Palaiokastro, Larissa, a village in the municipal unit Elassona, Larissa regional unit
 Palaiokastro, Messenia, a village in the municipal unit Trikorfo, Messenia
 Palaiokastro, the Greek name of Old Pylos castle
 Palaiokastro, Phthiotis, a village in the municipal unit Agios Georgios Tymfristou, Phthiotis
 Palaiokastro (alternative name Mavri Rachi), ruins of medieval castle and archaeological site, Psara Island
 Palaiokastro, Samos, a village in the municipal unit Vathy, Samos island
 Palaiokastro, Serres, a village in the municipal unit Skotoussa, Serres
 Paliokastro, Trikala, a former municipality in Trikala regional unit

See also
 Palekastro, a town in Lasithi, Crete